The Asian Excellence Awards was an annual celebration of the outstanding achievements of Asians and Asian Americans in film, television, music, and the performing arts. The Asian Excellence Awards is the only nationally televised event celebrating significant Asian and Asian American achievements in entertainment and the arts. The 2008 Asian Excellence Awards, hosted by Carrie Ann Inaba and Bobby Lee, were held at the UCLA Royce Hall and nationally televised on E! Entertainment on May 1, 2008. The show was also available on Comcast On Demand throughout the month of May in honor of Asian Pacific American Heritage Month.

The 2008 Asian Excellence Awards were highlighted with live performances by America's Best Dance Crew winners and runners up the Jabbawockeez and Kaba Modern and singer/actress Tia Carrere. There were also special awards presentations to honorees Steve Chen, the founder of YouTube, and Olympic Gold Medalist Kristi Yamaguchi.

History 
Welly Yang, the creator and one of the executive producers of the Asian Excellence Awards, is an actor, singer, producer and founder of the Asian theatrical group Second Generation, which produced the earlier version of the Asian Excellence Awards known as The Concert of Excellence.

Past awards

2007 
The 2007 Asian Excellence Awards was hosted by Lost star Daniel Dae Kim and Grace Park. The 2007 Asian Excellence Awards featured a presentation of The Lifetime Achievement Award that was presented to Chow Yun-fat. Live comedy performances included Russell Peters, Margaret Cho and Dat Phan. The 2007 show was the first to feature a viewer’s choice award, and the winner was Survivor winner Yul Kwon.

2006 
The 2006 Asian Excellence Awards featured the Rémy Martin X.O. Honors, which included an award to AIDS researcher Dr. David Ho for the Inspiration Honor and to writer/director Quentin Tarantino for the Bridge Honor. Live performances during the show included Fort Minor, featuring Mike Shinoda of Linkin Park, the original cast of the Broadway musical Lennon and Cirque du Soleil show KÀ. Kelly Hu and Bobby Lee were hosts of the show.

Both the 2006 and 2007 Asian Excellence Awards aired on AZN Television.

Award categories

Television 
 Outstanding Television Actress
 Outstanding Television Actor
 Supporting Television Actress
 Supporting Television Actor

Film 
 Outstanding Film Actress
 Outstanding Film Actor
 Supporting Film Actress
 Supporting Film Actor
 Outstanding Film

Winners

2008 
 Outstanding Television Actress: Lindsay Price, Lipstick Jungle
 Outstanding Television Actor: BD Wong, Law & Order: SVU
 Supporting Television Actress: Sonja Sohn, The Wire
 Supporting Television Actor: Rex Lee, Entourage
 Outstanding Film Actress: Sharon Leal, This Christmas
 Outstanding Film Actor: Tony Leung, Lust, Caution
 Outstanding Film: Lust, Caution

Honorees

 Pioneer Award: Steve Chen, Co-Founder of YouTube
 Inspiration Award: Kristi Yamaguchi, Olympic figure skating gold medalist
 Half Asian Award: Rob Schneider, actor-comedian

Viewer's Choice

 Favorite TV Personality: Cheryl Burke, Dancing with the Stars
 Favorite Reality Star: Jabbawockeez, America's Best Dance Crew

2007 
 Outstanding Television Actress: Parminder Nagra, ER
 Outstanding Television Actor: Masi Oka, Heroes
 Supporting Television Actress: Mindy Kaling, The Office
 Supporting Television Actor: Rex Lee, Entourage
 Outstanding Film Actress: Rinko Kikuchi, Babel
 Outstanding Film Actor: Kal Penn, The Namesake
 Supporting Film Actress: Maggie Q, Mission: Impossible III
 Supporting Film Actor: Dustin Nguyen, Little Fish
 Outstanding Film: Letters from Iwo Jima
 Outstanding Independent Film: Journey from the Fall
 Outstanding Comedian: Margaret Cho

Honorees

 Pioneer Award: Nobu Matsuhisa, restaurateur
 Lifetime Achievement Award: Chow Yun-fat, actor
 Visionary Award: Vivienne Tam, fashion designer

Viewer's Choice

 Favorite Reality Star: Yul Kwon, Survivor

2006 
 Outstanding Television Actress: Yunjin Kim, Lost
 Outstanding Television Actor: Daniel Dae Kim, Lost
 Outstanding Film Performance: Stephen Chow, Kung Fu Hustle
 Outstanding Film: Kung Fu Hustle

Honorees

 Outstanding Live Performance: Linkin Park
 Outstanding Stylemaker: Kimora Lee Simmons, Baby Phat
 Outstanding Newcomer: Lynn Chen, Saving Face

External links 
Asian Excellence Awards
Second Generation

References

Awards established in 2006
AZN Television original programming